Judy Tegart and Lesley Turner were the defending champions but lost in the final 6–4, 3–6, 6–2 against Karen Krantzcke and Kerry Melville.

Seeds
Champion seeds are indicated in bold text while text in italics indicates the round in which those seeds were eliminated. The joint top and one team of joint fifth seeded teams received byes into the second round.

Draw

Final

Top half

Bottom half

External links
 ITF draw

1968 in Australian tennis
Women's Doubles